Renae Ingles (née Hallinan) (born 18 July 1986 in Melbourne, Australia) is a former Australia netball international who played in 67 tests for Australia.

Career
Ingles was primarily a wing-defence and centre player. She started her career with the Melbourne Phoenix and played with them for five seasons in the Commonwealth Bank Trophy, before joining the Melbourne Vixens in 2008 in the new ANZ Championships. In 2009, she was an integral member of the Melbourne Vixens lineup that won the Vixens' first ANZ Championship title. She moved to the Adelaide Thunderbirds for the 2012 and 2013 season. She stayed with the Thunderbirds until announcing her retirement in 2017. She returned to netball mid-way through the following year for Melbourne Vixens and was later selected in the Australian Diamonds squad for the 2018/19 international season. Ingles announced her retirement from netball at the end of the 2019 season.

Ingles was awarded Netball Australia's Australian International Player of the Year in 2009. She was selected in the Australian Diamonds squad for the 2018/19 international season.

Major achievements
Australian Diamonds Commonwealth Games Team 2014 (Gold Medalists)
Liz Ellis Diamond Winner 2013
Australian Diamonds International Player of the Year 2013
Tanya Denver Award 2013
Adelaide Thunderbirds Premiership 2013
 Australian 2010 Commonwealth Games Team (Silver medalists)
 Australian Diamonds International Player of the Year 2009
 Melbourne Vixens Premiership 2009
 Vixens Excellence in Life & Sport Award 2009
 Vixens Coaches' Award 2009

Personal life
In August 2014 she announced via Twitter that she would be marrying basketballer Joe Ingles. On 29 August 2015 the couple wed at Bird in Hand Winery in Adelaide. In January 2016, Ingles announced she would not play in the 2016 season as she was pregnant. She subsequently gave birth to twins in Melbourne, a girl Milla and boy Jacob. In May 2020, Ingles announced on Instagram she was expecting the couple's third child, and on November 19th, 2020 Jack was born from the couple's US base.

References

External links
Melbourne Vixens Profile
Super Netball Profile

Commonwealth Games silver medallists for Australia
Netball players at the 2010 Commonwealth Games
Adelaide Thunderbirds players
Melbourne Vixens players
Melbourne Phoenix players
1986 births
Living people
People educated at Carey Baptist Grammar School
ANZ Championship players
Netball players from Melbourne
Commonwealth Games gold medallists for Australia
Netball players at the 2014 Commonwealth Games
Commonwealth Games medallists in netball
Australia international netball players
Victorian Netball League players
Australia international Fast5 players
South Australian Sports Institute netball players
2015 Netball World Cup players
Medallists at the 2010 Commonwealth Games
Medallists at the 2014 Commonwealth Games